Inquisitors of Satan is the second album by the black metal band Deathspell Omega, released in 2002 by Northern Heritage Records.

Track listing

References 

Deathspell Omega albums
2003 albums